In algebraic geometry, a relative effective Cartier divisor is roughly a family of effective Cartier divisors. Precisely, an effective Cartier divisor in a scheme X over a ring R is a closed subscheme D of X that (1) is flat over R and (2) the ideal sheaf  of D is locally free of rank one (i.e., invertible sheaf).

An effective Cartier divisor as the zero-locus of a section of a line bundle 
Let L be a line bundle on X and s a section of it such that  (in other words, s is a -regular element for any open subset U.)

Choose some open cover  of X such that . Now, define the closed subscheme  of X (called the zero-locus of the section s) by

This is well-defined (i.e., they agree on the overlaps) since  is a unit element. For the same reason, the closed subscheme  is independent of the choice of local trivializations.

Then  may be constructed as the fiber product of s and the zero-section embedding .

Finally, when  is flat over the base scheme S, it is an effective Cartier divisor on X over S. Furthermore, this construction exhausts all effective Cartier divisors on X as follows. Let D be an effective Cartier divisor and  denote the ideal sheaf of D. Because of locally-freeness, taking  of  gives the exact sequence

Properties 
If D and D'  are effective Cartier divisors, then the sum  is the effective Cartier divisor defined locally as  if f, g give local equations for D and D' .
If D is an effective Cartier divisor and  a flat morphism over R, then  is an effective Cartier divisor in X'  with the ideal sheaf .

Examples

Hyperplane bundle

Effective Cartier divisors on a relative curve 
From now on suppose X is a smooth curve (still over R). Let D be an effective Cartier divisor in X and assume it is proper over R (which is immediate if X is proper.) Then  is a locally free R-module of finite rank. Let  be a finite flat morphism. Then . On the other hand, a base change does not change degree: .

A closed subscheme D of X is finite, flat and of finite presentation if and only if it is an effective Cartier divisor that is proper over R.

Weil divisors associated to effective Cartier divisors 
Given an effective Cartier divisor D, there are two equivalent ways to associate Weil divisor  to it.

Notes

References 

Algebraic geometry